Red & Ted's Road Show (also known as Road Show) is a 1994 widebody pinball game designed by Pat Lawlor and released by Williams. It is part of WMS' SuperPin line of widebody games.

Country singer Carlene Carter provided the voice of Red, and her song, "Every Little Thing", is featured in the game. The game is considered an unofficial successor of FunHouse, as both were designed by Pat Lawlor and feature animated talking head(s) along with some similar playfield layout ideas. It is equipped with a shaker motor to make the machine vibrate and has two manual plungers, one on each side of the cabinet. It was the first pinball machine to feature an additional daily high score list.

Gameplay
The primary goal is to help Red and Ted, a pair of road construction workers, travel through the United States from east to west. The player can visit a total of 18 different cities/states, each of which starts its own scoring mode as listed below.
 New York - Smash a Cab
 Miami - Spring Break
 Atlanta - Worker Trapped
 Ohio (Turnpike)- Trapped in Ohio
 New Orleans - Mardi Gras
 Nashville - Change the Station (2 Ball Multiball)
 Chicago - Evil Toll Roads
 Dallas - Monster Cab
 Kansas City - Tornado (2 Ball Multiball)
 Minnesota/Minneapolis - Frozen People
 Albuquerque - Trading Post (Sell Souvenirs)
 Denver - Gold Rush
 Butte - Tunnel Hunt
 Salt Lake City - Old West
 Las Vegas - Slot Machine 
 Seattle - Alien Invasion
 San Francisco - Monster Attack
 Los Angeles - Earthshaker (reminiscence to Earthshaker!)

The game features a "wizard mode" called Super Payday, which can be started by visiting any of the last three cities in the above list and locking two balls as indicated on the display and playfield before the mode timer runs out.

Up to five extra balls can be earned per play; a score award is given for each one earned thereafter.

Digital Versions
Besides for unauthorized emulation via Visual Pinball, a licensed and official digitized version has been released for The Pinball Arcade in June 2015 for several platforms along with its predecessor Funhouse. Both of them had to be taken down from all digital stores on June 29, 2018 - right before WMS license expiration on June 30, 2018. This version also has the song "Every Little Thing" by Carlene Carter included.

Less than a year after the table was delisted from stores, Zen Studios, having recently acquired the license to develop digital conversions of Williams pinball tables, announced that they will bring back a digital version of Road Show as part of the fourth wave of Williams pinball table conversions, due to be available for purchase for Pinball FX 3 on May 28, 2019.

References

External links
 

Williams pinball machines
1994 pinball machines